At the Ryman is a 1992 live album by Emmylou Harris and her then-newly formed acoustic backing band, The Nash Ramblers, recorded at the one-time home of the Grand Ole Opry, Ryman Auditorium in Nashville, Tennessee.

The Nash Ramblers:
 Sam Bush – Fiddle, mandolin and vocals
 Roy Huskey Jr. – Double bass and vocals
 Larry Atamanuik – Drums
 Al Perkins – Banjo, guitar, resonator guitar and vocals
 John Randall Stewart – Guitar, mandolin and vocals

A companion video recording of the concert was released on VHS.

The concerts' and album's high acclaim are given near-universal credit for the renewed interest in reviving the dilapidated Ryman Auditorium as an active venue after nearly 20 years of dormancy. Soon after, the building was completely renovated and has since become a concert hall.

The album won Harris and the Ramblers a Grammy Award for Best Country Performance by a Duo or Group with Vocal at the 34th ceremony. In 2017, At the Ryman was released on vinyl to celebrate 25 years since the original release, Harris reunited with the Nash Ramblers to perform the album in its entirety.

Track listing

Chart performance

References

Emmylou Harris live albums
1992 live albums
Albums produced by Allen Reynolds
Albums produced by Richard Bennett (guitarist)
Warner Records live albums